The Democratic Coalition (DK) is a social-liberal political party in Hungary led by former Prime Minister Ferenc Gyurcsány. Founded in 2010 as a faction within the Hungarian Socialist Party (MSZP), the Democratic Coalition split from the MSZP on 22 October 2011 and became a separate party. It has nine MPs in the National Assembly and four MEPs in the European Parliament.

History

Within the Socialist Party
On 5 October 2010, Ferenc Gyurcsány announced to the Socialist Party (MSZP) party executive that he was founding a platform named the Democratic Coalition within the party. He stated that he would organize "a broad, open social community for 1989 Democrats", and political representation for them. The mood at the meeting was calm, but several party officials expressed disagreement with him. The plan, however, pushed through.

The Democratic Coalition held its inaugural meeting at 2 p.m. in the Szent István Park in the 13th District on 22 October 2010. Meanwhile, MSZP deputy chairman András Balogh told newspaper Népszava that the party performed poorly at the elections due to several mistakes which included incompetence of Gyurcsány's while in government, the abandonment of left-wing values, complacency, and the fact that Gyurcsány was involved in corruption. The former prime minister's group became the MSZP's seventh platform.

The platforms within the MSZP held a debate in May 2011 on whether the party should develop as an alliance between left-wing groups or a collective party welcoming non-leftist groups and politicians – a broader alternative to the ruling party Fidesz. The latter idea was only supported by the Democratic Coalition Platform. Representatives from all seven platforms of the party agreed that the Socialists did not need a "chieftain", an "Orbán of the Left", but a team leader. This was according to István Hiller, the head of the Social Democratic Platform, in an interview with reporters during a break of the meeting. He dismissed Gyurcsány's idea of embracing liberal and conservative trends, stating that Gyurcsány's model would make the party dysfunctional.

New party
On 22 October 2011, Gyurcsány announced he was leaving the Hungarian Socialist Party (MSZP) and would set up a new parliamentary group after persuading the necessary number of lawmakers to join him. The new Democratic Coalition party was to be a "Western, Left-wing" formation with ten lawmakers. Gyurcsány announced on the first anniversary of the founding of its forerunner, the Democratic Coalition Platform. He stated that he had decided to leave the MSZP because the party had failed in its efforts to transform itself. Socialist representatives strongly condemned Gyurcsány, who had signed a pledge to stay on in the party the previous week. In his speech Gyurcsány branded the new constitution as "illegitimate" and insisted that members and heads of the independent branches of state such as the constitutional court and the public prosecutor "exclusively serve Viktor Orbán".

The former Democratic Party (Demokrata Párt) changed its name to Democratic Coalition (DK) and elected Gyurcsány its leader on 6 November 2011. At a press conference, Gyurcsány announced that the renewed party had elected Tamás Bauer, József Debreczeni, Csaba Molnár and Péter Niedermüller as deputy chairmen. The announcement stated that DK would be Hungary's "most democratic party" with all the members electing its officials directly at the party congress, adding that the authority of each member in the party's 12-strong presidium and the chairman itself will be virtually the same. The new party initially received over 3,800 membership applications.

The Democratic Coalition was not allowed to form a new party faction until the spring after leaving the MSZP, based on the parliament's Constitutional and Procedural Committee decision on 7 November 2011. According to the parliamentary rules, any parliamentarian that leaves or is expelled from a party faction must sit as an independent candidate for six months before joining another faction. However, in April 2012, ruling party Fidesz approved new House rules which required that 12 MPs – rather than 10 as per previous rules – were needed to form a faction, thus blocking DK from forming a parliamentary group. Gyurcsány described this as "petty revenge on the part of the prime minister." Csaba Molnár said they might take the matter to the Constitutional Court and European forums.

Cooperation negotiations of 2014
In September 2013, the MSZP declined to sign an election deal with DK and Gábor Fodor's Hungarian Liberal Party because both parties presented excessive expectations in proportion to their electoral support. Attila Mesterházy told a forum held at the party headquarters, broadcast by commercial news channel ATV, that in order to win the next year's election, the MSZP need to win over uncertain voters. He added that the party board decided that running with Gyurcsány would keep uncertain voters away. Gyurcsány said the MSZP had instead proposed alliances of four rather than nine constituencies, all of which were impossible to win. In addition, they offered every 25th place on their party list and would have banned Gyurcsány himself from running either individually or on a list. Another request was that DK should not present a platform of its own. The party could not accept these conditions, the politician said.

On 14 January 2014, centre-left opposition parties agreed to submit a joint list for the spring 2014 general election. The list was headed by MSZP leader Attila Mesterházy, the centre-left alliance's candidate for Prime Minister. Mesterházy was followed by Gordon Bajnai (Together 2014) as second and Ferenc Gyurcsány as third. Liberal leader Gábor Fodor was entered at fourth place and co-leader of the E14-PM alliance and the Dialogue for Hungary (PM). Tímea Szabó was entered at fifth place on the joint list of the MSZP, E2014-PM, DK, and Liberals. The Hungarian Liberal Party also received two additional places (56th and 58th) on the list. The party eventually won 4 seats.

In the 2014 European election, DK received 9.75% of the vote, and had two MEPs returned. On 26 May 2014, Csaba Molnar announced that DK had applied to join the Progressive Alliance of Socialists and Democrats.

Independent performance and united opposition

The party ran alone in the 2018 parliamentary election, scoring 5.38% and electing 9 MPs in the National Assembly.

In the 2019 European election, DK did very well, scoring 16.08%, overtaking the Hungarian Socialist Party and Jobbik and becoming the leading opposition party. In 2019 local election, the party had its best performance in Tatabánya and in Budapest, where 3 district mayorships were won.

In 2020, two more mayorships in Budapest were added to DK after two mayors, elected as MSZP candidates, joined Democratic Coalition. After this DK became the second largest party in General Assembly of Budapest (after Fidesz–KDNP alliance) and the largest party in opposition's coalition, which is ruling in the Budapest.

In 2020, Hungarian Liberal Party member Anett Bősz joined DK's political group in the National Assembly.

In late 2020, the party joined joint opposition list along with the Momentum Movement, MSZP, Jobbik, the Dialogue, LMP and Hungarian Liberal Party.

In 2021, the party took part in Hungarian opposition primary. In these elections DK joined forces with the Hungarian Liberal Party. This joint ticket came first by number of constituencies (32) and votes and its candidate to the Prime Minister Klára Dobrev won the first round but lost the run-off.

In October 2022, the party became an associate member of the Party of European Socialists.

Ideology and international relations
Party leader and former Prime Minister of Hungary Ferenc Gyurcsány is a supporter of Third Way politics. The party platform also adopted elements of social liberalism and strongly pro-European themes. During the 2019 European Parliament election campaign, the leader of the Democratic Coalition's EP list, Klára Dobrev, announced to the press, that during her party's mandates, they would pursue to build the United States of Europe, thus making her party a European federalist as well. During the campaign, DK included several centre-left proposals in its Platform, including action against child poverty, an EU-wide minimum pension, an EU minimum wage, a new EU tax on multinational corporations and EU funds for affordable housing, thus moving to a more social democratic program.

The party is not a member of any European political party; however, its MEPs are members of the Progressive Alliance of Socialists and Democrats (S&D). Following the 2019 European election, the Democratic Coalition dismissed an invitation to join the Alliance of Liberals and Democrats for Europe and chose to remain in the S&D group.

Election results

National Assembly

European Parliament

Local Elections
 Angéla Németh – Budapest XV District (since 2018)
 József Tóth – Polgár (since 2014)
Imre László – Budapest XI District (since 2019)
Péter Niedermüller – Budapest VII District (since 2019)
Ilona Szücsné Posztovics – Tatabánya (since 2019)
László Kiss Dr - Budapest III District (since 2020)
Sándor Szaniszló - Budapest XVIII District (since 2020)
Tibor Déri - Budapest IV District (since 2022)

References

External links
 Democratic Coalition official website

Political parties established in 2011
2011 establishments in Hungary
Left-wing parties in Europe
Left-wing populism
Liberal parties in Hungary
Parties represented in the European Parliament
Populist parties
Pro-European political parties in Hungary
Progressive Alliance of Socialists and Democrats
Progressive parties
Social liberal parties
Hungarian Socialist Party breakaway groups
Ferenc Gyurcsány
Opposition to Viktor Orbán